Runa Førde  (24 February 1933 – 28 July 2017) was a Norwegian painter, illustrator and graphic artist.

She was born in Oslo to Inger Else Johanne Steenberg and Sverre Førde. She studied at the Norwegian National Academy of Craft and Art Industry and at the Norwegian National Academy of Fine Arts. She has illustrated several children's books and readers for elementary school. She is represented at the National Gallery of Norway, Riksgalleriet, the National Gallery of Denmark, and in galleries in Beijing and the Faroe Islands.

References

1933 births
2017 deaths
Artists from Oslo
Norwegian illustrators
Norwegian women painters
Norwegian women illustrators
Oslo National Academy of the Arts alumni
20th-century Norwegian painters
21st-century Norwegian painters